Muzaffar Hussain Baig is an Indian politician. He was the former Deputy Chief Minister of the Indian state of Jammu and Kashmir. On Republic Day of 2020 he received India's third highest civilian honour Padma Bhushan.

Baig was the founding member of Jammu and Kashmir People's Democratic Party led by Mufti Mohammad Sayeed and was named as Patron of the party post-Mufti's death in 2016.

Awards
Padma Bhushan in 2020

Early life 
He was born in Wahidna, a small hilly village in Baramulla district of the Kashmir valley. He received his master's degree from Harvard Law School.

Career 
He started his political career in 1996 with the Jammu and Kashmir People's Conference where he held the position of Vice-Chairman. 
In 2002, he fought the Legislative Assembly election with the Jammu and Kashmir People's Democratic Party and won from Baramulla constituency. He was reelected in 2008. He held the position of Law Minister and Parliamentary Affairs Minister in the state cabinet for the period 2002–2006. Until 2006 he was Deputy Chief Minister of Jammu and Kashmir.

He served as Chief Spokesperson for the Jammu and Kashmir People's Democratic Party. He also worked in law firms in the United States and New Delhi in India. Baig served as Advocate General of the state of Jammu and Kashmir from 1987 to 1989.

Baig was elected to the Lok Sabha in 2014 from Baramulla.

In 2020, Baig was conferred the Padma Bhushan award, the third-highest civilian honor of India.

Due to differences between him and Mehbooba Mufti, that grew after the abrogation of Article 370, It was being allegedly said that Baig joined Sajjad Lone's Jammu and Kashmir People's Conference, Peoples Conference disowns senior leader Muzaffar Baig. Party general secretary Imran Ansari said Baig never joined JKPC.

References 

Deputy chief ministers of Jammu and Kashmir
Harvard Law School alumni
Living people
20th-century Indian lawyers
Jammu and Kashmir Peoples Democratic Party politicians
21st-century Indian Muslims
People from Baramulla
India MPs 2014–2019
Lok Sabha members from Jammu and Kashmir
State cabinet ministers of Jammu and Kashmir
Kashmiri people
1946 births
Recipients of the Padma Bhushan in public affairs
Jammu and Kashmir People's Conference politicians